Cymindis abeillei is a species of ground beetle in the subfamily Harpalinae. It was described by Jeannel in 1942.

References

abeillei
Beetles described in 1942